Isoflupredone, also known as deltafludrocortisone and 9α-fluoroprednisolone, is a synthetic glucocorticoid corticosteroid which was never marketed.

Its acetate ester, isoflupredone acetate, is used in veterinary medicine.

References

Further reading 

 

Diketones
Fluoroarenes
Glucocorticoids
Pregnanes
Triols
Abandoned drugs